Flumetasone pivalate is a synthetic glucocorticoid corticosteroid and a corticosteroid ester.  It is the 21-acetate ester of flumetasone.

References 

Corticosteroid esters
Glucocorticoids